Ophryophryne pachyproctus is a species of frog in the family Megophryidae. It is found in China, Laos, Vietnam, and possibly Cambodia. Its natural habitats are subtropical or tropical moist lowland forests, subtropical or tropical moist montane forests, and rivers. It is threatened by habitat loss.

References

pachyproctus
Amphibians of China
Amphibians of Laos
Amphibians of Vietnam
Taxonomy articles created by Polbot
Amphibians described in 1985
Taxobox binomials not recognized by IUCN